Hoplarista is a monotypic moth genus of the family Noctuidae. Its only species, Hoplarista haemaplaga, is found in Zambia. Both the genus and species were first described by George Hampson in 1910.

The Global Lepidoptera Names Index gives this name as a synonym of Paida Jordan, 1896.

References

Endemic fauna of Zambia
Agaristinae
Monotypic moth genera